The 1990 Bexley Council election took place on 3 May 1990 to elect members of Bexley London Borough Council in London, England. The whole council was up for election and the Conservative party stayed in overall control of the council.

Background

Election result

Ward results

References

1990
1990 London Borough council elections